Ernst Klodwig (23 May 1903 in Aschersleben, German Empire – 15 April 1973 in Hamburg, West Germany) was a racing driver from East Germany. He participated in two Formula One World Championship Grands Prix, driving privately run BMWs with different engines. He was classified in both races with a best finish of 12th.

Complete Formula One World Championship results
(key)

References
 

1903 births
1973 deaths
German racing drivers
People from the Province of Saxony
People from Aschersleben
Racing drivers from Saxony-Anhalt
East German Formula One drivers